Arthur F. Burns (1904–1987) was an American economist, former Federal Reserve Chairman

Arthur Burns may also refer to:
Arthur Burns (historian), King's College, London
Arthur Burns (police officer) (1917–2008), British Chief Constable of Suffolk
Arthur John Burns (1830–1901), Scottish-born New Zealand politician and woollen mill owner
Art Burns (born 1954), American discus thrower